Kamsar is a port city in Guinea, West Africa. It is also a Sub-prefecture of Guinea. It is located on the mouth of the Nunez River.

Port Kamsar handles significant part of the world's bauxite production. Ships calling Port Kamsar and going direct to the quay of Guinea Bauxite Company for loading bauxites are limited to length overall (LOA) 229m. Ship length restrictions led to appearance of the new dry bulk carrier categories - Kamsarmax.

Transport 
It has a standard gauge railway line feeding bauxite from the mine at Sangarédi to the port.

The city is served by Kawass Airport.

Climate
Kamsar has a tropical monsoon climate (Am) with little to no rainfall from December to April and heavy to extremely heavy rainfall from June to October with moderate rainfall in May and November.

Hospitals 
 Hôpital ANAIM
 Centre de Santé de Kassapô

Places of Worship 
 Mosquée CBG
 Église St. Jean Baptiste
 Mosquée Bagataye
 Mosquée Bas-Fond
 Mosquée Siminoune

See also 
 Transport in Guinea
 Railway stations in Guinea

External links 
 Rail Map (gray line)

References 

Sub-prefectures of the Boké Region